Pongsan station is a railway station located in Pongsan-ŭp, Pongsan County, North Hwanghae Province, North Korea. It is on located on the P'yŏngbu Line, and it is the starting point of the Pongsan Line.

History
Pongsan station was originally opened by the Chosen Government Railway in 1906 as Madong station;  the name was changed after the establishment of the DPRK.

References

Railway stations in North Korea
Buildings and structures in North Hwanghae Province
Railway stations opened in 1906
1906 establishments in Korea